Ron Cutler may refer to:
 Ron Cutler (bishop)
 Ron Cutler (radio broadcaster)